Ute og hjemme was a Norwegian weekly magazine, released by Allers Familie-Journal in January 2008. The magazine was based in Oslo. Its target group was "women and their families 35 years and older". The editor was Lars Gulbrandsen. It soon faced competition from the very similar magazine Ute & Inne, and was discontinued after slightly more than a year.

References

External links

2008 establishments in Norway
2009 disestablishments in Norway
Defunct magazines published in Norway
Magazines established in 2008
Magazines disestablished in 2009
Magazines published in Oslo
Norwegian-language magazines
Weekly magazines published in Norway
Women's magazines published in Norway